Monil Patel (born 5 May 1990) is an Indian cricketer who plays for Baroda. He made his first-class debut on 22 October 2015 in the 2015–16 Ranji Trophy.

References

External links
 

1990 births
Living people
Indian cricketers
Baroda cricketers
Cricketers from Greater London